The Great Shadow is a 1920 American silent drama film directed by Harley Knoles and starring Tyrone Power Sr., Donald Hall and  Dorothy Bernard.

The making of the film is the subject of the Canadian play of the same name, written by Alex Poch-Golden.

Plot
Jim McDonald, the head of an union, struggles against a group of Bolsheviks led by Klimoff. A strike is called and McDonald's child is killed due to sabotage. Elsie, daughter of the capitalist Donald Alexander, is kidnapped by the Bolsheviks, but is saved by her lover, a secret agent.

Cast
 Tyrone Power Sr. as Jim McDonald 
 Donald Hall as Donald Alexander
 Dorothy Bernard as Elsie Alexander
 Jack Rutherford as Bob Sherwood 
 Louis Stern as Klimoff
 E. Emerson as Greek leader
 Eugene Hornboestel as Frank Shea

Production
The film was sponsored by the Canadian Reconstruction Association. A Vickers factory in Montreal and a film studio in Trenton, Ontario were used for filming. Union members at the factory were used as unpaid extras.

References

Works cited

Bibliography
 Connelly, Robert B. The Silents: Silent Feature Films, 1910-36, Volume 40, Issue 2. December Press, 1998.
 Munden, Kenneth White. The American Film Institute Catalog of Motion Pictures Produced in the United States, Part 1. University of California Press, 1997.

External links
 

1920 films
1920 drama films
1920s English-language films
American silent feature films
Silent American drama films
American black-and-white films
Films directed by Harley Knoles
Selznick Pictures films
1920s American films